Nejmeddin Daghfous (born 1 October 1986) is a German-born Tunisian professional footballer who plays as a midfielder for FC Gießen.

Club career
Daghfous made his debut on the professional league level in the 2. Bundesliga for 1. FSV Mainz 05 on 21 October 2007, coming on as a substitute in the 78th minute in a game against Wehen Wiesbaden. He made his Bundesliga debut on 11 May 2013 against Borussia Mönchengladbach replacing Yunus Mallı in the 78th minute.

In late January 2014, Daghfous signed an 18-month contract with 2. Bundesliga side VfR Aalen.

In June 2017, he left Würzburger Kickers following their relegation from 2. Bundesliga and joined SV Sandhausen one a two-year contract with the option of a further year. In June 2019, Daghfous joined Kickers Offenbach on a two-year contract.

International career
Daghfous was called up to the Tunisia national team for a 2018 World Cup qualification match against Guinea in September 2016.

References

External links
 
 

1986 births
Living people
Tunisian footballers
German footballers
Association football midfielders
Germany youth international footballers
Sportspeople from Kassel
German people of Tunisian descent
Bundesliga players
2. Bundesliga players
3. Liga players
1. FSV Mainz 05 II players
1. FSV Mainz 05 players
SC Paderborn 07 players
SC Preußen Münster players
VfR Aalen players
Würzburger Kickers players
SV Sandhausen players
Kickers Offenbach players
FC Gießen players
Footballers from Hesse